The Grand Chavalard is a mountain in the western part of the Bernese Alps in Valais, overlooking the Rhone at Fully near Martigny. The mountain is located close to the Dent de Morcles on the north-west.

References

External links

 Grand Chavalard on Summitpost
 Grand Chavalard on Hikr

Mountains of the Alps
Mountains of Switzerland
Mountains of Valais
Two-thousanders of Switzerland